Christy F. Landes is an American physical chemist who is the Kenneth S. Pitzer-Schlumberger Chair at Rice University. She seeks to understand the structure-function relationships in biological processes and materials. She was appointed a National Academy of Sciences Kavli Fellow in 2019.

Early life and education 
Landes was an undergraduate student in chemistry at George Mason University. She moved to Georgia Tech for her doctoral research, where she majored in physical chemistry under the supervision of Mostafa El-Sayed. After earning her doctorate, Landes joined the University of Oregon as a postdoctoral researcher with Geraldine L. Richmond, where she spent one year before joining the University of Texas at Austin with Paul Barbara.

Research and career 
Landes joined the University of Houston at an assistant professor in 2006, and moved to Rice University in 2009. She was appointed Kenneth S. Pitzer-Schlumberger Chair in 2021. Her early independent work considered super-resolution single molecule spectroscopy for the characterization of biomolecules using FRET with membrane receptors and  diffusion within polymer brushes and porous hydrogel materials. She has pioneered the application of super-resolution microscopy to understand chromatography and has focused on tuning the plasmonic properties of nanomaterials using electrochemistry and stimuli-responsive polymers. She has also shown how silver ions disperse from the tips of gold-silver nanoparticle alloys, which may improve catalytic activity. Her biophysical chemistry work has demonstrated that single-molecule approaches could be used to better understand cancer metastasis.

Landes established the NSF Center for Adapting Flaws into Features (CAFF) in 2021 and serves as its director. The center investigates the defects in silicon-based electronics that hold promise for improving device performance, explore the structural and optoelectronic processes that make these flaws influential, and realize technologies that incorporate and exploit these flaws.

Landes was elected Chair of the Physical Chemistry Division in 2020.

Awards and honors 
 2011 National Science Foundation CAREER Award
 2016 American Chemical Society Early-Career Award in Experimental Physical Chemistry
 2019 Rice Institute of Biosciences and Bioengineering Hamill Innovation Award
 2019 National Academy of Sciences Kavli Fellow
 2020 National Science Foundation Award for Special Creativity

Selected publications

References 

Living people
George Mason University alumni
Georgia Tech alumni
Rice University faculty
American women scientists
21st-century American chemists
Physical chemists
Year of birth missing (living people)
21st-century American women scientists